The KMG's (Krazy Mess Groovers) is a Belgian group that won the chance to represent Belgium with the song "Love Power" in the Eurovision Song Contest 2007 in Helsinki, Finland.

Since the Eurovision Song Contest only allow six performers on stage at one time, a part of the group did not perform at the song contest. Those who participated were Sexyfire, Mr Scotch, Mr French Kiss, Big Boss, Mr Cream and Lady Soulflower. T] At Eurovision, they performed 24th in the running order and were not announced for the top 10 qualifiers having placed 26th in a pool of 28 finishing with 14 points.

Members 
 Sexyfire (Wakas Ashiq) (Pakistani ancestry) – vocal  
 Mr Scotch (Piotr Paluch) (Polish ancestry) – keyboards
 Mr French Kiss (Raphaël Hallez) (French-born) – trumpet 
 Big Boss (Tuan N'Guyen) (born in Liège, Vietnamese ancestry) – alto saxophone 
 The Answer – trombone 
 Mr DeeBeeDeeBop – baritone saxophone
 Captain Thunder – electric guitar 
 Mr Cream (François Cremer) – drummer 
 Mr Y – vocal  
 Lady Soulflower (Chrystel Wautier) (born in La Louvière, Ukrainian ancestry) – vocal

References

External links
 
 Video of song "Love Power"
 The KMGs MySpace page
 Esctoday website on KMG winning the national selection

Eurovision Song Contest entrants for Belgium
Eurovision Song Contest entrants of 2007